The men's heptathlon at the 2016 IAAF World Indoor Championships took place on March 18 and 19, 2016.

Results

60 metres
The 60 metres was started on March 18 at 11:30.

Long jump
The long jump was started on March 18 at 12:20.

Shot put
The shot put was started on March 18 at 17:15.

High jump
The high jump was started on March 18 at 18:45.

60 metres hurdles
The 60 metres hurdles was started on March 19 at 11:00.

Pole vault
The pole vault was started on March 19 at 12:00.

1000 metres

The 1000 metres was started on March 19 at 19:35.

Final standing
After all events.

References

Heptathlon
Combined events at the World Athletics Indoor Championships